Skeletons & Majesties is an EP album of German power metal band Gamma Ray released on 8 April 2011, recorded between November 2010 and February 2011 at Hammer Recording Studios Hamburg. Engineered, mixed and mastered by Eike Freese.

Skeletons:

Majesties:

Bonus tracks:

2011 EPs
Gamma Ray (band) albums